TriMet (stylized as TRIMET) is an outdoor 1977 aluminum sculpture by American artist Robert Maki, installed on the Mount Hood Community College campus in Gresham, Oregon, United States. According to the Regional Arts & Culture Council, which administers the work, "TRIMET serves as an excellent example of how Maki's technical background is reflected in his work. The sculpture is built of geometric shapes that evolve and morph as the viewer moves around it, using negative space to help define the mass of the sculpture itself." It measures  and was funded by TriMet and the United States Department of Transportation.

See also

 1977 in art
 Trapezoid E (1975), Eugene, Oregon

References

External links
 TRIMET at the Public Art Archive
 Tri-Met unveils final plans for light rail project (November 18, 2005), PSU Vanguard

1977 establishments in Oregon
1977 sculptures
Abstract sculptures in Oregon
Aluminum sculptures in Oregon
Mt. Hood Community College
Outdoor sculptures in Gresham, Oregon
Sculptures on the MAX Green Line